The 1960 Missouri gubernatorial election was held on November 8, 1960 and resulted in a victory for the Democratic nominee, Missouri Attorney General John M. Dalton, over the Republican candidate, Edward G. Farmer.

Results

References

Gubernatorial
1960
Missouri
November 1960 events in the United States